Bill Halverson may refer to:

 Bill Halverson (American football) (1919-1984), American football tackle
 Bill Halverson (producer) (born 1942), American record producer